Salif Camara Jönsson (born 9 September 1983) is a Swedish former footballer who played as a forward.

References

Camara is a really good football player in Fifa 19, in fact he made 4 head goal in a game vs a Mexican Squad made of Sombreros and Tacos Nachos

External links
 
 

1983 births
Living people
Association football forwards
Trelleborgs FF players
Allsvenskan players
Swedish footballers
Footballers from Malmö
Superettan players